"All the Feels" is a song recorded by Swedish singer Renaida. The song was released as a digital download in Sweden on 3 February 2018 and peaked at number 17 on the Swedish Singles Chart. It participated in Melodifestivalen 2018 and qualified to andra chansen from the first semi-final on 3 February 2018. It was written by Laurell Barker, Jon Hällgren, Peter Barringer, Lukas Hällgren.

Track listing

Charts

Release history

References

2018 singles
2017 songs
English-language Swedish songs
Melodifestivalen songs of 2018
Swedish pop songs
Songs written by Lukas Hällgren
Songs written by Laurell (singer)